

Events and publications

January
January 8 and June 7: Pablo Picasso makes the comic The Dream and Lie of Franco, a comic strip satirizing Francisco Franco. 
January 9: The first issue of the Italian catholic comic magazine Il vittorioso (The winner) is published.
January 16: The first issue of the Flemish comics magazine Ons Kinderland is published. It will run for about a year and a half.
The first issue of the Italian comic magazine Albi d’oro (Golden albums), gathering the Mickey Mouse's strips, is published by Mondadori.
 Will Eisner and Jerry Iger (script) and Mort Meskin (art) launch Sheena, Queen of the Jungle in the first issue of Wags, a British comics magazine. A year and nine months later Sheena will make her debut in the U.S. in Jumbo Comics. 
 Detective Picture Stories #2 - Centaur Publications
 Famous Funnies #30 - Eastern Color
 The Funnies #4 - Dell Comics
 Funny Picture Stories #3 - Centaur Publications
 King Comics #10 - David McKay Publications
 More Fun Comics (1936 series) #17 - National Periodical Publications
 New Adventure Comics (previously New Comics) (1936 series) #12 - National Periodical Publications
 Popular Comics #12 - Dell Comics
 Tip Top Comics #9 - United Features

February
 February 13: Harold Foster's Prince Valiant makes its debut.
 Detective Picture Stories #3 - Centaur Publications
 Famous Funnies #31 - Eastern Color
 The Funnies #5 - Dell Comics
 Funny Pages #8 — Centaur Publications
 Funny Picture Stories #4 - Centaur Publications
 King Comics #11 - David McKay Publications
 More Fun Comics (1936 series) #18 - National Periodical Publications
 New Adventure Comics (1936 series) #13 - National Periodical Publications
 Popular Comics #13 - Dell Comics
 Star Comics #1 - Centaur Publications
 Star Ranger #1 - Centaur Publications
 Tip Top Comics #10 - United Features
 Western Picture Stories #1 - Centaur Publications

March
 March 1: The first issue of DC Comics comics magazine Detective Comics is published. It features the debut of Jerry Siegel and Joe Shuster's Slam Bradley. Detective Comics will eventually become the longest continuously published comic book magazine in the United States, running without interruption until 2011.
 Marcy 17: The Tiger Tea storyline in George Herriman's Krazy Kat is concluded after 10 months. 
 March 22: Jack Monk and Don Freeman's Buck Ryan makes its debut and will run until July 1962.
 The Comics #1 - Dell Comics
 Detective Picture Stories #4 - Centaur Publications
 Famous Funnies #32 - Eastern Color
 The Funnies #6 - Dell Comics
 Funny Pages #9 — Centaur Publications
 Funny Picture Stories #5 - Centaur Publications
 King Comics #12 - David McKay Publications
 More Fun Comics (1936 series) #19 - National Periodical Publications
 New Adventure Comics (1936 series) #14 - National Periodical Publications
 Popular Comics #14 - Dell Comics
 Tip Top Comics #11 - United Features
 Western Picture Stories #2 - Centaur Publications

April
April 5: The first episode of Floyd Gottfredson's Mickey Mouse in search of jungle treasure is published.
Ace Comics (1937 series) #1 - David McKay Publications
 The Comics #2 - Dell Comics
 Detective Comics (1937 series) #2 - DC Comics
 Detective Picture Stories #5 - Centaur Publications
 Famous Funnies #33 - Eastern Color
 The Funnies #7 - Dell Comics
 Funny Pages #10 — Centaur Publications
 Funny Picture Stories #6 - Centaur Publications
 King Comics #13 - David McKay Publications
 Popular Comics #15 - Dell Comics
 Star Comics #2 - Centaur Publications
 Star Ranger #2 - Centaur Publications
 Tip Top Comics #12 - United Features
 Western Picture Stories #3 - Centaur Publications

May
 May 3: Henning Dahl Mikkelsen, aka Mik's Ferd'nand makes its debut. It will become one of the longest-running pantomime gag-a-day comics in the world, appearing without interruption until 2012.
 May 15: In the 67th issue of the British comics magazine Mickey Mouse Weekly William A. Ward adapts the Disney animated short Don Donald into a comic strip. This marks the first longer adventure comic to star Donald Duck.
 Ace Comics (1937 series) #2 - David McKay Publications
 The Comics #3 - Dell Comics
 Detective Comics (1937 series) #3 - DC Comics
 Famous Funnies #34 - Eastern Color
 Feature Book #1 - David McKay Publications
 The Funnies #8 - Dell Comics
 King Comics #14 - David McKay Publications
 More Fun Comics (1936 series) #20 - National Periodical Publications
 New Adventure Comics (1936 series) #15 - National Periodical Publications
 Popular Comics #16 - Dell Comics
 Star Comics #3 - Centaur Publications
 Star Ranger #3 - Centaur Publications
 Tip Top Comics #13 - United Features

June
 June 9: The first issue of the Italian comics magazine Il Vittorioso is published. It will run until 1970. 
 June 30: The first issue of the Flemish comics magazine Wonderland is published, as a supplement to the newspaper De Dag. It will run until 1942.
 Ace Comics (1937 series) #3 - David McKay Publications
 Detective Comics (1937 series) #4 - DC Comics
 Famous Funnies #35 - Eastern Color
 Feature Book #2 - David McKay Publications
 The Funnies #9 - Dell Comics
 Funny Pages #11 — Centaur Publications
 Funny Picture Stories #7 - Centaur Publications
 King Comics #15 - David McKay Publications
 More Fun Comics (1936 series) #21 - National Periodical Publications
 New Adventure Comics (1936 series) #16 - National Periodical Publications
 Popular Comics #17 - Dell Comics
 Star Comics #4 - Centaur Publications
 Star Ranger #4 - Centaur Publications
 Tip Top Comics #14 - United Features
 Western Picture Stories #4 - Centaur Publications

July
 July 1: Theo Fünke Kupper's gag comic De Verstrooide Professor makes its debut in the Dutch comics weekly Kleuterblaadje, where it will appear until 1 January 1966.
 July 12: Al Capp and Raeburn Van Buren's Abbie an' Slats makes its debut. It will run until 30 January 1971.
 Ace Comics (1937 series) #4 - David McKay Publications
 The Comics #4 - Dell Comics
 Detective Comics (1937 series) #5 - DC Comics
 Famous Funnies #36 - Eastern Color
 Feature Book #3 - David McKay Publications
 The Funnies #10 - Dell Comics
 King Comics #16 - David McKay Publications
 More Fun Comics (1936 series) #22 - National Periodical Publications
 New Adventure Comics (1936 series) #17 - National Periodical Publications
 Popular Comics #18 - Dell Comics
 Star Comics #5 - Centaur Publications
 Star Ranger #5 - Centaur Publications
 Tip Top Comics #15 - United Features

August
August 9: The first episode of Floyd Gottfredson's The monarch of Medioka is published, a parody of The prisoner of Zenda. 
 The final issue of the French satirical magazine Le Charivari, which offered room for countless comics artists and cartoonists, is published.
 Watt Dell's Olga Mesmer makes its debut. It will run until October 1938.
 Ace Comics (1937 series) #5 - David McKay Publications
 Detective Comics (1937 series) #6 - DC Comics
 Famous Funnies #37 - Eastern Color
 Feature Book #4 - David McKay Publications
 The Funnies #11 - Dell Comics
 King Comics #17 - David McKay Publications
 More Fun Comics (1936 series) #23 - National Periodical Publications
 New Adventure Comics (1936 series) #18 - National Periodical Publications
 Popular Comics #19 - Dell Comics
 Tip Top Comics #16 - United Features

September
 Ace Comics (1937 series) #6 - David McKay Publications
 The Comics #5 - Dell Comics
 Detective Comics (1937 series) #7 - DC Comics
 Famous Funnies #38 - Eastern Color
 Feature Book #5 - David McKay Publications
 The Funnies #12 - Dell Comics
 Funny Pages V.2 #1 — Centaur Publications
 Funny Picture Stories V.2 #1 - Centaur Publications
 King Comics #18 - David McKay Publications
 More Fun Comics (1936 series) #24 - National Periodical Publications
 New Adventure Comics (1936 series) #19 - National Periodical Publications
 Popular Comics #20 - Dell Comics
 Star Comics #6 - Centaur Publications
 Star Ranger #6 - Centaur Publications
 Tip Top Comics #17 - United Features

October
 October 17: In Al Taliaferro's Donald Duck newspaper comic strip Huey, Louie and Dewey make their debut.
 Ace Comics (1937 series) #7 - David McKay Publications
 Detective Comics (1937 series) #8 - DC Comics
 Famous Funnies #39 - Eastern Color
 Feature Book #6 - David McKay Publications
 Feature Funnies (1937 series) #1 - Comic Favorites, Inc.
 The Funnies #13 - Dell Comics
 Funny Pages V.2 #2 — Centaur Publications
 Funny Picture Stories V.2 #2 - Centaur Publications
 King Comics #19 - David McKay Publications
 More Fun Comics (1936 series) #25 - National Periodical Publications
 New Adventure Comics (1936 series) #20 - National Periodical Publications
 Popular Comics #21 - Dell Comics
 Star Comics #7 - Centaur Publications
 Star Ranger #7 - Centaur Publications
 Tip Top Comics #18 - United Features

November
 November 17: The final episode of A.M. de Jong and George van Raemdonck's long-running newspaper comic Bulletje en Boonestaak is published. 
 November 28: The final episode of Bud Counihan's Betty Boop newspaper comic is published.
 Ace Comics (1937 series) #8 - David McKay Publications
 Detective Comics (1937 series) #9 - DC Comics
 Famous Funnies #40 - Eastern Color
 Feature Book #7 - David McKay Publications
 Feature Funnies (1937 series) #2 - Comic Favorites, Inc.
 The Funnies #14 - Dell Comics
 Funny Pages V.2 #3 — Centaur Publications
 Funny Picture Stories V.2 #3 - Centaur Publications
 King Comics #20 - David McKay Publications
 More Fun Comics (1936 series) #26 - National Periodical Publications
 New Adventure Comics (1936 series) #21 - National Periodical Publications
 Popular Comics #22 - Dell Comics
 Tip Top Comics #19 - United Features

December
 December 4: First issue of the long-running British comics magazine The Dandy #1 - DC Thomson. It will run until December 4, 2012. It its first issue Dudley D. Watkins's Desperate Dan, Allan Morley's Freddie the Fearless Fly, John R. Mason's Barney Boko and Keyhole Kate and James Crighton's Korky the Cat make their debut.
 December 28: Hugh McClelland's Beelzebub Jones makes its debut. It will run until 28 December 1945. 
 December 30: The first issue of the Italian Disney comics magazine Paperino e altre avventure (Donald Duck) is published. It stars a Donald Duck story by Federico Pedrocchi (Paperino e il mistero di Marte, Donald Duck and the Mars mystery) and is actually the first time that Donald is featured as the star of a continuous adventure comics series, long before the same willen happen in the United States.
 Ace Comics (1937 series) #9 - David McKay Publications
 Detective Comics (1937 series) #10 - DC Comics
 Famous Funnies #41 - Eastern Color
 Feature Book #8 - David McKay Publications
 Feature Funnies (1937 series) #3 - Comic Favorites, Inc.
 The Funnies #15 - Dell Comics
 Funny Pages V.2 #4 — Centaur Publications
 Funny Picture Stories V.2 #4 - Centaur Publications
 King Comics #20 - David McKay Publications
 More Fun Comics (1936 series) #27 - National Periodical Publications
 New Adventure Comics (1936 series) #22 - National Periodical Publications
 Popular Comics #23 - Dell Comics
 Star Comics #8 - Centaur Publications
 Star Ranger #8 - Centaur Publications
 Tip Top Comics #20 - United Features

Specific date unknown
 In Hanover, Germany the Wilhelm Busch Museum opens its doors. 
 Hector Torino's Don Nicola makes his debut.

Specials
 New Book of Comics (1937 series) #1 - National Periodical Publications

Births

February
 February 9: Hiroshi Hirata, Japanese comic artist, (d. 2021).

Deaths

January
 January 10: Gabriele Galantara, Italian journalist, caricaturist and comics artist, dies at age 73.

March
 March 8: Carlos Ángel Díaz Huertas, Spanish painter, illustrator and comics artist, dies at age 70 or 71. 
 March 17: Harold Earnshaw, British comics artist and illustrator (The Pater), passes away at age 51.
 March 20: Ramón Cilla, Spanish caricaturist and comics artist, dies at age 76.

May
 May 26: Lansing Campbell, American writer, illustrator and comic artist (Uncle Wiggily's Adventures), dies at age 55. 
 May 27: Garnet Warren, American comic artist (Mr. and Mrs. Garden Green, The Holmes Home and Jack and Jill), dies at age 53 or 54.

July
 July 6: M.T. Penny Ross, American comics artist and illustrator  (Mamma's Angel Child, assisted on Buster Brown), passes away at age 56.

August
 August 28: Frederick Burr Opper, American comics artist (Happy Hooligan, Alphonse and Gaston, And Her Name Was Maud), dies at age 80.

October
 October 16: Jean de Brunhoff, French novelist, illustrator and comics artist (Babar the Elephant), passes away at age 37 of tuberculosis.

November
 November 10: Sergej Mironović Golovčenko, Croatian illustrator and comics artist (Maks i Maksic), dies at age 38 or 39.

December
 December 5: Gustave Verbeek, American comics artist (The Upside Downs of Little Lady Lovekins and Old Man Muffaroo), passes away at age 70.
 December 11: Herbert Crowley, British painter and comics artist (The Wigglemuch), dies at age 54 or 54.

Specific date unknown
 G. L'Huer, French illustrator (made text comics for Le Quantin), passes away at age 63 or 64. 
 Joan Llopart, Spanish illustrator and comics artist, passes away at age 80. 
 Jean Rapsomanikis, Greek-Spanish comics artist (Ojo De Lince), dies at age 52.
 William Ridgewell, British cartoonist, illustrator and comics artist, dies at age 55 or 56.

First issues by title
Ace Comics cover dated April, published by David McKay Publications.
Detective Comics cover dated March, published by DC Comics.
Feature Funnies cover dated October, published by Harry A. Chesler Comics.
The Dandy cover dated December, published by DC Thomson.

Renamed titles
New Comics renamed New Adventure Comics as of the January cover date.

Initial appearances by character name
Slam Bradley in Detective Comics #1 - March. Published by DC Comics
Speed Saunders in Detective Comics #1 - March. Published by DC Comics

Three Little House Family (Year 1937) Kase Maper Mom And Dog

Kase Emotion Kase Happy Kase Meh Comic Strip Chapter 1 (January 6, 1937)

Maper Emotion Maper Happy Maper Meh Comic Strip Chapter 2 (January 13, 1937)

Mom Emotion Mom Happy Mom Meh Comic Strip Chapter 3 (January 20, 1937)

Dog Emotion Dog Happy Dog Meh Comic Strip Chapter 4 (January 22, 1937)

Kase Emotion Kase Shy Kase Sad Comic Strip Chapter 5 (February 3, 1937)

Dog Emotion Dog Shy Dog Sad Comic Strip Chapter 6 (February 10, 1937)

Maper Emotion Maper Shy Maper Sad Comic Strip Chapter 7 (February 12, 1937)

Mom Emotion Mom Shy Mom Sad Comic Strip Chapter 8 (February 17, 1937)

Mom Emotion Mom Flirty Mom Angry Comic Strip Chapter 9 (April 6, 1937)

Kase Emotion Kase Flirty Kase Angry Comic Strip Chapter 10 (April 10, 1937)

Dog Emotion Dog Flirty Dog Angry Comic Strip Chapter 11 (April 17, 1937)

Maper Emotion Maper Flirty Maper Angry Comic Strip Chapter 12 (April 20, 1937)

Maper Emotion Maper Mischievous Maper Tired Comic Strip Chapter 13 (July 4, 1937)

Dog Emotion Dog Mischievous Dog Tired Comic Strip Chapter 14 (July 7, 1937)

Mom Emotion Mom Mischievous Mom Tired Comic Strip Chapter 15 (July 11, 1937)

Kase Emotion Kase Mischievous Kase Tired Comic Strip Chapter 16 (July 20, 1937)

Kase Emotion Kase Playful Kase Confused Comic Strip Chapter 17 (October 6, 1937)

Dog Emotion Dog Playful Dog Confused Comic Strip Chapter 18 (October 10, 1937)

Mom Emotion Mom Playful Mom Confused Comic Strip Chapter 19 (October 17, 1937)

Maper Emotion Maper Playful Maper Confused Comic Strip Chapter 20 (October 22, 1937)

Kase Emotion Kase Loving Kase Hurt Strip Chapter 21 (November 3, 1937)

Maper Emotion Maper Loving Maper Hurt Comic Strip Chapter 22 (November 7, 1937)

Mom Emotion Mom Loving Mom Hurt Comic Strip Chapter 23 (November 10, 1937)

Dog Emotion Dog Loving Dog Hurt Comic Strip Chapter 24 (November 17, 1937)

Mom Emotion Mom Bashful Mom Grumpy Comic Strip Chapter 25 (December 5, 1937)

Kase Emotion Kase Bashful Kase Grumpy Comic Strip Chapter 26 (December 9, 1937)

Maper Emotion Maper Bashful Maper Grumpy Comic Strip Chapter 27 (December 20, 1937)

Dog Emotion Dog Bashful Dog Grumpy Comic Strip Chapter 28 (December 28, 1937)

Kase Maper Mom Dog Terrible Taste Yucky Poop Eggs Burger Waffle Worms Comic Strip Chapter 29 (March 7, 1937)

Three Little House Family Virginia Comic Strip Chapter 30 (Jul 22, 1937)

Three Little House Family Working Comic Strip Chapter 31 (November 21, 1937)

Sources